RNIE 3 is a national highway of Benin. It passes from north to south in the west of the country running near the border with Togo.

Cities and towns
Tanguiéta
Natitingou
Bassila
Bantè

References

Roads in Benin